Benjamin Friedman may refer to:

Benny Friedman (1905–1982), American football quarterback
Benjamin M. Friedman (born 1944), American political economist

See also
Benjamin H. Freedman (1890–1984), American businessman, Holocaust denier and anti-Zionist
Benjamin Freeman (disambiguation)